The following is a list of countries where Spanish is an official language, plus a number of countries where Spanish or any language closely related to it, is an important or significant language.

Official or national language
Spanish is the official language (either by law or de facto) in 20 sovereign states and one dependent territory, totaling around 442 million people. This includes Equatorial Guinea, where it is official but not a native language.

In these countries and territories, Spanish is the main or mostly used language of communication of the vast majority of the population; official documents are written chiefly or solely in that language; and it is taught in schools and utilized as the primary medium of instruction as part of the official curriculum.

Sovereign states

Territory

Notes:

Significant language
Though not an official language at the national level, Spanish is regularly spoken by significant populations throughout these countries. Public services, education, and information are widely available in Spanish, as are various forms of printed and broadcast media.

Andorra 

The Spanish language is not official but also holds a special status (in the education system, the media, and some official documents) in the Principality of Andorra which shares land borders with Spain. Public education in Spanish, following the Spanish public education system is offered in Andorra. In 2008, 30.8% of students were enrolled in the Spanish education system.

Belize 

Spanish has no official recognition in the Central American nation of Belize, a Commonwealth realm where English is the official national language. However, the country shares land borders with Spanish-speaking Mexico and Guatemala and, per the 2010 Belizean census, Spanish is spoken by a sizable portion of the population; 30% claim Spanish as a mother tongue and about 50% of the population has working knowledge of the language. The Census Report 2010 reported that 56.6% of Belizeans spoke Spanish.

Gibraltar 

The Spanish language is not official but also holds a special status (in the education system, the media, and some official documents) in the British Overseas Territory of Gibraltar, which shares land borders with Spain.

United States 

Spanish has been spoken in the United States for several centuries in the Southwest and Florida, which were all once part of New Spain. However, today only a minority of Spanish speakers in the U.S. trace their language back to those times; the overwhelming majority of speakers come from recent immigration. Only in northern New Mexico and southern Colorado has Spanish maintained speaking communities uninterruptedly since colonial times.

Spanish is the most studied foreign language in United States schools and is spoken as a native tongue by 41 million people, plus an additional 11 million fluent second-language speakers. Though not official, Spanish has a special status in the American state of New Mexico. With almost 60 million native speakers and second language speakers, the United States now has the second largest Spanish-speaking population in the world after Mexico. Spanish is increasingly used alongside English nationwide in business and politics. In the United States, the language is regulated by the North American Academy of the Spanish Language.

Historical language

Philippines 

Spanish was an official language of the Philippines from the beginning of the Hispanic period in 1565 and through independence until a constitutional change in 1973. However, President Ferdinand Marcos had Spanish redesignated as an official language under Presidential Decree No. 156, dated 15 March 1973 and Spanish remained official until 1987, when it was re-designated as a voluntary and optional auxiliary language.

On 8 August 2007, President Gloria Macapagal Arroyo announced that the Philippine government asked help from the Spanish Government in her plan to reintroduce Spanish as a required subject in the Philippine school system. By 2012, the language was a compulsory subject at only a very select number of secondary schools. In spite of government promotion of Spanish, less than 0.5% of the population are able to speak Spanish at least proficiently.

While Spanish is designated as an optional government language in the Philippines, its usage is very limited and not present in everyday life. Despite this, Tagalog and other native Philippine languages incorporate a large number of Spanish loanwords, as a result of 300 years of Spanish influence. In the country, Spanish is regulated by the Philippine Academy of the Spanish Language.

Western Sahara 

Spanish is a secondary language, alongside the official Arabic, in the Sahrawi Arab Democratic Republic, a former Spanish colony and now a partially recognized state that claims Western Sahara, whose territory is mostly occupied by Morocco. However, Spanish is not a native language in the territory, and the Moroccan government uses Arabic and French in its administration of Western Sahara.

Creole languages 

There are a number of Spanish-based creole languages. Chavacano is spoken in Zamboanga City in the Philippines and is a regional language. Papiamento is the official language in Aruba, Bonaire, and Curaçao; it has been classified as either a Spanish-based or a Portuguese-based creole.

Chamorro is an Austronesian language with many Spanish loanwords; some scholars have considered it a creole, but the most authoritative sources deny this.

Judeo-Spanish 

Judaeo-Spanish (sometimes known as Ladino or other names) is a language derived from medieval Spanish; it is still spoken by some Sephardi Jews, mainly in Israel.

International organizations 

United Nations (UN)
European Union (EU)
Union of South American Nations (UNASUR)
African Union (AU)
Central American Integration System (SICA)
Latin American Parliament (Parlatino)
United Nations Economic Commission for Latin America and the Caribbean (ECLAC)
Organization of American States (OAS)
Organization for Security and Co-operation in Europe (OSCE)
Organization of Ibero-American States (OEI)
World Trade Organization (WTO)
North American Free Trade Agreement (NAFTA)
Mercosur
Andean Community of Nations (CAN)
Caribbean Community (CARICOM)
Latin American Integration Association (ALADI)
Antarctic Treaty Secretariat (ATS)
International Labour Organization (ILO)
Food and Agriculture Organization (FAO)
International Telecommunication Union (ITU)
Latin Union
Pacific Alliance
Interpol
Fédération Internationale de Football Association (FIFA)
Inter-American Development Bank
World Tourism Organization (UNWTO)

See also 
 Hispanophone

References 

Countries